Death Breath is a Swedish death metal band featuring Robert Pehrsson (Thunder Express/Dundertåget) and Nicke Andersson, formerly of the death metal band Entombed, who wanted to return to playing drums and death metal. The members of the band are both members of other bands but do not consider Death Breath to be a side project. The band was formed in 2005 and was originally intended to be named Black Breath but to the band's surprise the name Death Breath had never been used by a metal band. The band consider their music to be pure death metal, free from seven-string guitars, five-string basses and triggered drums. The band's music is influenced by Slayer, Venom, Black Sabbath, Autopsy, Celtic Frost as well as old horror movies and HP Lovecraft.

Members

Current members 
 Robert Pehrsson – vocals, guitar
 Nicke Andersson – drums, guitar, bass
 Scott Carlson – vocals, bass
 Erik Wallin – guitar

Former members 
Mange Hedquist – bass

Other contributors 
 Jörgen Sandström – vocals
 Fred Estby – vocals
 Erik Sahlstrom – vocals

Discography 
Studio albums
 Stinking Up the Night (2006)

Extended plays
 Let It Stink (EP, 2007)
 The Old Hag (EP, 2022)
Singles
 "Death Breath" (2006)

References

External links 
 Official website 

Swedish death metal musical groups
Musical groups established in 2005
Musical quartets